Gibbohammus stricticollis is a species of beetle in the family Cerambycidae, and the only species in the genus Gibbohammus. It was described by Wang and Chiang in 1999.

References

Lamiini
Beetles described in 1999